Mohammed Ali Abdallah Addarrat (born 13 September 1975 in Tripoli, Libya) is a Libyan political activist. Serves as Senior Advisor to the Libyan Government of National Accord for US Affairs.

Background 
He is the second of seven children to Ali Abdallah Addarrat & Fatima Senoussi.

Political Activist 
Addarrat joined the National Front for the Salvation of Libya at a very young age in exile, and became one of its young protégés. Worked as part of Al-Inqad magazine publishing team, as well as part of the Radio Broadcasting team, and member of a musical group that produced patriotic songs about Libya. Appointed to the NFSL's Permanent Bureau in 2002, and later to its Executive Committee in 2004.  
He was elected as the Deputy Secretary General of the NFSL in 2007, serving with Mr. Ibrahim Sahad.  
He was responsible for the NFSL's operations inside Libya from 2004 until the 2011 Libyan civil war.
He was media representative for the group.
Addarrat served a 2-year term in the inaugural General National Congress of Libya (GNC) 2012–2014, and served as the Chairman of the Financial Planning, Budget, and Finance oversight sub-committee. He was the President of the National Front Party (3rd Largest Party in Libya) from 2012 - 2017. He was selected to serve on the UN led political dialogue group that produced the Libyan Political Agreement representing The National Front Party on the committee.

Professional career 
Held several political leadership & professional consultative roles between 2012–2017. Currently serves as a Senior Advisor for US Affairs to the Libyan Government of National Accord (GNA).

References

External links
http://audioboo.fm/boos/449756-mohammed-ali-abdallah-from-nfsl-talks-about-possible-massacre-at-tripoli-prison
http://www.aljazeera.com/programmes/insidestory/2011/09/201191275448551995.html
Reuters
http://www.antiguaobserver.com/?p=57577

1975 births
National Front for the Salvation of Libya politicians
Living people
People of the First Libyan Civil War
Libyan Sunni Muslims
People from Tripoli, Libya